Margita Alfvén (November 16, 1905 – March 11, 1962) was a Danish-born Swedish film actress of the silent and early sound era.

She was the daughter of the composer Hugo Alfvén and the artist Marie Krøyer.

Selected filmography
 Her Little Majesty (1925)
 The Million Dollars (1926)
 Uncle Frans (1926)
 Jansson's Temptation (1928)
Parisiennes (1928)
 The Way Through the Night (1929)
 Three from the Unemployment Office (1932)
 Girls to Marry (1932)

References

Bibliography
 Tommy Gustafsson. Masculinity in the Golden Age of Swedish Cinema: A Cultural Analysis of 1920s Films. McFarland, 2014.

External links

1905 births
1962 deaths
Actresses from Copenhagen
Swedish film actresses
Danish emigrants to Sweden